Lakshmanan Vijayalakshmi is an Indian actress and classical dancer whose career was from 1959 to 1969. She appeared in Malayalam, Tamil, Kannada, Telugu and Hindi films.

Early life and training 

Vijayalakshmi was born in Ernakulam and was raised in Tirunelveli. Her family then moved to Pune. There, at six years of age, Vijayalakshmi was inspired when she saw Vyjayanthimala, Lalitha and Padmini dance at the South Indian Association; she eventually started to practice dance in the backyard of her house.

Vijayalakshmi's father noticed her talent for dancing and sent her to a mentor, Sukumara Pillai.

Vijayalakshmi's first performance was at a temple in Andhra Pradesh when she was nine years old. When Vijayalakshmi needed advanced dance training in the discipline of Bharathanatyam, her family moved to Madras. They lived in South Mada Street, Mylapore and Vijayalakshmi was mentored by Kamala. 

Then, quite by accident when walking near the Kapaleeswarar Temple, Vijayalakshmi met K. J. Sarasa, who sent her to the dance teacher, Vazhuvoor Ramaiah Pillai. E. V. Saroja was also his student. Ten months later, on 28 October 1955, Vijayalakshmi made her debut at the Rasika Rajya Sabha, a cultural organisation.

Vijayalakshmi was not from a wealthy family. She had only one costume for the three-hour performance. The family could not offer more than tea as refreshments to the audience, and there were no printed invitations. Despite these disadvantages, the concert was well attended. 
Vijayalakshmi was introduced by E. Krishna Iyer, a classical artist. The filmmaker, V. Shantaram and the dance exponent, Kamala Lakshmanan, were in attendance.

Following her debut, Vijayalakshmi was offered employment at no less than four cultural organisations (sabha). However, her teacher suggested she advance her dance skills through tuition with T. K. Swaminatha Pillai.

Acting career 
Vijayalakshmi's debut film performance was in S. K Chaari's film, Marumakal (1952). In 1959, she acted in a character role and danced in the Telugu language film Sipayi Kuthuru. This involved training and performing in a modified classical dance style. Vijayalakshmi's beauty and dance skill made her suitable for that film and other films of the time, so she became well known. She was cast with NTR, ANR and other well-known performers.

Vijayalakshmi was also cast in a few Malayalam language movies. Three of these were with Prem Nazir. Some of these films were with Jnana Sundari, Laila Majnu, and Sathya Bhama.

In Tamil films, Vijayalakshmi was cast with actors such as M. G. Ramachandran, Sivaji Ganesan, Jaishankar, Gemini Ganesan, R. Muthuraman, and Ravichandran.

Many of Vijayalakshmi's films include the Bhangra dance form. One such film is Kudiyirundha Koyil, which features the song, Aadaludan Paadalai Kettu Rasipathilethan Sugam Sugam, with MGR in her partner role.

Vijayalakshmi's Tamil language film debut was Paadhai Theriyudhu Paar (1960), and she also acted in "Aalukkoru Veedu". Although it won a National Film Award for Best Feature Film in Tamil, the movie was not a commercial success. Some suggested Vijaylakshmi should have danced in this movie, but the director indicated she had not because her character did not know how to dance.

In 1964, Vijayalakshmi was cast in the S. Balachander movie Bommai, a Tamil suspense thriller. It was shown for at least a hundred days in Madras theatres. Ooty Varai Uravu (1967) directed by C.V. Sridhar was one of her most popular Tamil movies.

Personal life 
In 1969, while shooting Ooty Varai Uravu, Vijayalakshmi married her brother's friend, Surajit Kumar De Dutta, an agricultural scientist working in Philippines. After getting married, Vijayalakshmi took the Benares Hindu matriculation exam as a private candidate. She then completed Bcom in Madras University through correspondence. In 1969, she moved to Manila, Philippines. In 1977, when Morarji Desai, the prime minister of India (1977 - 1979) visited Manila, the Indian Embassy asked Vijayalakshmi to dance at an official function. In 1991, Vijayalakshmi moved to the United States. She became an auditor and was employed as a budgeting officer at Virginia Polytechnic University.

She pursued Masters in Accounting and CPA (Certified Public Accounting equal to CA in India) in Virginia Polytechnic Institute and State University (in Blacksburg, Virginia), commonly known as Virginia Tech. Now she is residing Davis, California where her only son has a software company in Silicon Valley.

Filmography

Telugu 
 Sipayi Kuthuru (1959)
 Jagadekaveeruni Katha (1961)
 Aradhana (1962)
 Mahamantri Thmmarusu (1962)
 Gundamma Katha (1962)
 Srikakula Andhra Maha Vishnu Katha (1962)
 Narthanasala (1963)
 Punarjanma (1963)
 Pooja phalam (1964)
 Bhabruvahana (1964)
 Bobbili Yuddham (1964)
 Ramudu Bheemudu (1964)
 Vijaya Simha (1965)
 Aakasa Ramanna 1965 (1965)
 Mangamma Sapatham (1965)
 Pandava Vanavasamu (1965)
 Paramanandayya Sishyula Katha (1966)
 Pidugu Ramudu (1966)
 Aata Bommalu (1966)
 Sangeeta Lakshmi (1966)
 Srikrishnaavataaram (1967)
 Ummadi Kutumbam (1967)
 Bhama Vijayam (1967)
 Nindu Manasulu (1967)
 Kanchukota (1967)
 Bhakta Prahlada (1967)
 Sipayi Chinnayya (1969)

Malayalam 
 Jnaanasundari (1961)
 Laila Majnu (1962)
 Snaapaka Yohannaan (1963)
 Sathyabhaama (1963)

Tamil

Hindi 
 Husn Aur Ishq (1966)
 Baadal (1966)
 Alibaba and the Forty Thieves (1966)
 Shabnam (1964)

Kannada 
Satya Harishchandra (1965)
Sri Purandara Dasaru (1967)

References

External links 

Actresses in Kannada cinema
Actresses in Malayalam cinema
Actresses in Tamil cinema
Actresses in Telugu cinema
Indian film actresses
Actresses from Kochi
Actresses in Hindi cinema
20th-century Indian actresses
Year of birth missing (living people)
Living people